The Type 45 destroyer, also known as the D or Daring class, is a class of six guided-missile destroyers built for the United Kingdom's Royal Navy in the early 21st century. The class is primarily designed for anti-aircraft and anti-missile warfare and is built around the PAAMS (Sea Viper) air-defence system using the SAMPSON Active electronically scanned array (AESA) and the S1850M long-range radars. The first three destroyers were assembled by BAE Systems Surface Fleet Solutions from partially prefabricated "blocks" built at different shipyards; the remaining three were built by BAE Systems Maritime – Naval Ships. The first ship in the Daring class, HMS Daring, was launched on 1 February 2006 and commissioned on 23 July 2009.

The Type 45 destroyers were built to replace the Type 42 (Sheffield-class) destroyers that had served during the Falklands War, with the last Type 42 being decommissioned in 2013. The National Audit Office reported that, during an "intensive attack", a single Type 45 could simultaneously track, engage and destroy more targets than five Type 42 destroyers operating together. After the launch of Daring on 1 February 2006, Admiral Sir Alan West, then First Sea Lord, stated that it would be the Royal Navy's most capable destroyer ever, as well as the world's best air-defence ship. The reduction in the number to be procured from twelve, then to (up to) eight, finally with only six confirmed (in 2008) was controversial.

In 2016, it was revealed that due to a design flaw on the Northrop Grumman intercooler attached to the Rolls-Royce WR-21 gas turbines, power availability was diminished considerably when functioning in the warm climate of the Persian Gulf, and it quickly became apparent that the class was not operating as originally envisioned. Therefore, a planned refit was scheduled from 2019 to 2021 to fully resolve the problems with the six ships in the class.

Under current plans, the Type 45 destroyer will be replaced by the Type 83 destroyer, the first of which is expected to enter service in the late 2030s.

Development

The UK had sought to procure a new class of air-defence guided-missile destroyers in collaboration with seven other NATO nations under the NFR-90 project; the project collapsed due to varying requirements of the different countries involved. The UK then joined France and Italy in the  programme; however, differing national requirements, workshare arguments and delays led to the UK withdrawing on 26 April 1999 and starting its own national project. On 23 November 1999, Marconi Electronic Systems (MES) was confirmed as the prime contractor for the Type 45 project. Seven days later, MES and British Aerospace merged to form BAE Systems (BAE), making the latter the prime contractor.

The Type 45 project has been criticised for rising costs and delays, with the six ships costing £6.46 billion, an increase of £1.5 billion (29%) on the original budget. The first ship entered service in 2010, rather than 2007 as initially planned. In 2007, the Defence Select Committee expressed disappointment that the Ministry of Defence (MoD) and BAE had failed to control rising costs.

Construction
The Type 45 destroyers take advantage of Horizon development work and use the Sea Viper air-defence system and the SAMPSON radar. The ships were built by BAE Systems Maritime – Naval Ships, which subsequently became BVT Surface Fleet with the merger of the surface shipbuilding arms of BAE Systems and VT Group. These two companies had previously built the ships in collaboration. BAE's two Glasgow shipyards and single Portsmouth shipyard were responsible for different "blocks". BAE's Govan yard built Block A (stern to the edge of the helicopter hangar). The Scotstoun yard built Blocks B/C (a 2600-tonne section that contains the Rolls-Royce WR-21 gas turbines, starting with the helicopter hangar to the bridge section) and Block D (the bridge section itself). BAE's Portsmouth shipyard was responsible for Blocks E/F (bridge to the bow), funnels, and masts. For ships two to six, blocks A–D were assembled in the Ships Block and Outfit Hall of the Govan shipyard and taken fully outfitted to the Scotstoun berth. The masts and funnels were also fitted before launch.

For the first-of-class, Block A was assembled at Govan and moved to Scotstoun, where it was mated to Block B/C, which was already fitted with the WR-21 turbines and machinery. Block D, also assembled at Scotstoun, was fitted to these three blocks. The bow sections (E/F) were mated at HMNB Portsmouth and taken by barge to Scotstoun. These were the final blocks to be attached. At this point, the hull was launched into the Clyde and towed to the Scotstoun Dry Dock, where the masts and funnels were fitted (the masts were partially outfitted with equipment. For example, the mast for the S1850M radar is sent from Portsmouth to Thales Nederland to be fitted with radar equipment). Once this was complete, the remaining equipment was fitted: radar arrays, bow-mounted sonar, propellers, missile equipment, and the 4.5-inch gun.

This modular construction arrangement was agreed upon in February 2002. However, when the original contract for three ships was signed in July 2000, BAE Systems Marine was to build the first and third ships, and VT Group was to build the second.

By the end of 2010, all six Type 45 destroyers had been launched, with the first two in commission and the remainder fitting out. By 2012, all destroyers were structurally complete and the production lines, had been closed. , the last of the Type 45 destroyers, was commissioned at Portsmouth Naval Base on 26 September 2013 and entered service in 2014 after trials and training.

The Daring class are the largest escorts ever built for the Royal Navy in terms of displacement.

In 2009, delivery of the ships' Aster missiles was delayed due to a manufacturing fault with a single batch of missiles identified during testing.

Characteristics

General specifications
This makes them significantly larger than the Type 42 they replaced (displacement ). The Type 45 destroyers are the first British warships built to meet the Lloyd's Register's Naval Ship Rules for hull structure requiring design approval by Lloyd's Register for the principal structural arrangements of the vessel. BAE Systems is the Design Authority for the Type 45, a role traditionally held by the Ministry of Defence. The design of the Type 45 brings new levels of radar signature reduction to the Royal Navy. Deck equipment and life rafts are concealed behind the ship's superstructure panels, producing a "clean" superstructure. The mast is also sparingly equipped externally. Speculation by the press suggests that this design gives the ship the radar cross-section of a small fishing boat.

The Daring class is notable for being the first Royal Navy vessels to include gender-neutral living spaces to accommodate male and female crew members; communal shower and heads facilities have given way to individual cubicles, and six-person berths for junior ratings are far more flexible in accommodating a mixture of male and female sailors. Men and women will continue to sleep in separate spaces, in common with most other navies.

Propulsion and power

The Type 45 is fitted with an advanced and innovative integrated electric propulsion system. Integrated electric propulsion seeks to supply all propulsion and the ship's electrical load using alternating current at a high quality of voltage and frequency. This is achieved by computerised control, high-quality transformation, and electrical filtering. Two Rolls-Royce WR-21 gas turbines drive GE alternators, and along with two Wärtsilä 12V200 diesel generators, provide electrical power at 4,160 volts to a GE high voltage system. The high voltage supply is then used to power two GE Power Conversion advanced induction motors with outputs of  each. Ship's services, including hotel load and weapons system power supplies, are supplied via transformers from the high voltage supply at 440 V and 115 V. The benefits of integrated electric propulsion are cited as:

Placing the electric motors closer to the propeller, shortening the shaft line and removing the need for a gearbox or controllable pitch propellers, and reducing exposure to action damage.
Ability to arrange machinery in more convenient locations away from the shaft line, reducing space lost to funnels, and improving access for maintenance.
 Flexibility in running propulsion and ship services from any combination of prime movers, reducing engine running hours and emissions.
Ability to distribute prime mover power between services and propulsion can accommodate future increases in service and weapon loads with minimal impact on ship speed or prime movers.

The key to the efficient use of a single prime mover is the choice of a gas turbine that provides efficiency over a large load range; the WR-21 gas turbine incorporates compressor intercooling and exhaust heat recovery, making it significantly more efficient than previous marine gas turbines, especially at low and medium load. High power density and the hydrodynamic efficiency of a longer hull form allow high speeds to be sustained.

Faults
In January 2016, the Ministry of Defence acknowledged that the propulsion system was (prior to upgrade) unreliable, with the BBC reporting that "total electric failures are common".

The Rolls Royce WR-21 gas turbine itself is of a sound design, however, the Northrop Grumman intercooler unit "has a major design flaw and causes the WR-21s to fail occasionally. When this happens, the electrical load on the diesel generators can become too great, and they 'trip out', leaving the ship with no source of power or propulsion. The First Sea Lord, Admiral Philip Jones, clarified that the "WR-21 gas turbines were designed in extreme hot weather conditions to what we call 'gracefully degrade' in their performance, until you get to the point where it goes beyond the temperature at which they would operate... we found that the resilience of the diesel generators and the WR-21 in the ship at the moment was not degrading gracefully; it was degrading catastrophically, so that is what we have had to address".

While the Ministry of Defence does not release detailed information related to the number of problems experienced by the class, including total engine failure, several such occasions have been reported in the media. Daring broke down in November 2010 and April 2012, Dauntless in February 2014 and Duncan in November 2016. In November 2017, The Register reported that a Type 45 destroyer had been recalled to Britain with propeller problems, leaving the Royal Navy's traditional "east of Suez" deployment without proper warship cover. It was stated that "HMS Diamond is on her way back to the UK after a propeller problem proved too much for the ship's crew to repair on their own."

On 21 March 2018, the MoD announced the award of the £160 million "Power Improvement Project" (PIP) contract to BAE Systems, BMT Defence Services, and Cammell Laird to remove the two current diesel generators and install three larger diesel generators at the latter's shipyard in Birkenhead. Replacement or rectification of the WR-21s was not a practical option. With the new diesel generators, the Type 45 needs to rely on the WR-21s only for higher-speed running and always with graceful degradation to cruising without catastrophic loss of power. Dauntless arrived at Cammell Laird on 6 May 2020 to become the first ship to start the PIP upgrade. Completion of the upgrade of all six ships is planned by the mid-2020s.

Advanced air-defence

The Type 45 destroyers are primarily designed for anti-air warfare, able to defend against targets such as fighter aircraft, drones, and highly maneuverable sea-skimming anti-ship missiles travelling at supersonic speeds. The Royal Navy describes the destroyers' mission as "to shield the Fleet from air attack".

The Type 45 destroyer is equipped with the Sea Viper (PAAMS) air-defence system utilising the SAMPSON active electronically scanned array multi-function radar and the S1850M long-range radar. PAAMS can track over 2,000 targets and simultaneously control and coordinate multiple missiles in the air at once, allowing a large number of tracks to be intercepted and destroyed at any given time. This makes it particularly difficult to swamp PAAMS during a saturation attack, even if the attacking elements are supersonic. The US Naval War College has suggested that the SAMPSON radar is capable of tracking 1,000 objects the size of a cricket ball travelling at three times the speed of sound (Mach 3), emphasising the system's capabilities against high-performance stealth targets.

A core component of PAAMS is the Aster missile, comprising Aster 15 and Aster 30. MBDA describes Aster as a "hit-to-kill" anti-missile missile capable of intercepting all types of high-performance air threats at a maximum range of 120 km. The Aster missile is autonomously guided and equipped with an active RF seeker enabling it to cope with "saturated attacks" thanks to a "multiple engagement capability" and a "high rate of fire". The Daring-class destroyers are equipped with a 48-cell A50 Sylver Vertical Launching System, allowing for a mix of up to 48 Aster 15 and 30 missiles.

In addition to its anti-air warfare role, PAAMS offers additional anti-ballistic missile capabilities. In March 2013, the United States Naval Institute reported that the Royal Navy, along with the United States Missile Defense Agency, would explore the potential of the Daring class to provide ballistic missile defence in Europe along with United States Navy Aegis Combat System-equipped destroyers. In May 2014, Jane's Information Group reported that the United Kingdom is committing more funds to explore the capabilities of the SAMPSON multi-function radar and the Type 45 destroyer in a ballistic missile defence role. This followed a successful live firing event at the Ronald Reagan Ballistic Missile Defense Test Site, Kwajalein Atoll in the Western Pacific Ocean, where Daring demonstrated the ability to "[detect] at the earliest opportunity, with tracks maintained through to intercept" two medium-range ballistic missile surrogate targets. BAE Systems reportedly told Jane's that the SAMPSON multi-function radar "exceeded expectations in all respects". An "Experiment Concurrency and Cueing (TECC)" event for the Type 45 was planned for late 2015.

Due to the greater capabilities of the Type 45 over predecessors, the high price per ship, and the public attention they have attracted, defence analysts and correspondents have referred to them as the "most advanced" or "most powerful" air-defence destroyers in the world. BAE Systems claim that "the Type 45 Destroyer is recognised as the most advanced anti-air warfare vessel in the world." Nick Brown, the editor-in-chief of Jane's International Defence Review, was quoted by The Huffington Post saying, "It's certainly one of the most advanced air defence ships in the world... The US Aegis system is similar, but Sea Viper is more advanced."

Weapons, countermeasures, capabilities and sensors

Anti-air warfare
The Sea Viper air-defence system consists of the SAMPSON active electronically scanned array multi-function air tracking radar, which is capable of tracking hundreds of targets (range ).
 S1850M 3D long-range air surveillance radar, capable of tracking up to 1,000 targets (range 400 km).
A 48-cell A50 Sylver Vertical Launching System for a mix of up to 48 shorter-ranged Aster 15 missiles and Aster 30 Block 0 missiles covering .

The Type 45 did not have a formal theatre ballistic missile defence (TBMD) capability, but its potential for such a role was being assessed. Land-based Aster 30 Block 1 missiles have intercepted short-range ballistic missiles, and trials of a land-based SAMPSON modified for BMD were planned for early 2012. The Ministry of Defence announced in 2013 that the first ship, Daring, would take part in ballistic defence trials with the US Missile Defence Agency (MDA) as part of a major research and development programme. In March 2016, Britain and France announced a joint procurement programme with the intention of France acquiring Brimstone missiles to equip the Eurocopter Tiger Mk 3 helicopter and Britain acquiring Aster Block 1NT missiles capable of intercepting medium-range ballistic missiles of  range. A block 2 version of the Aster 30 NT capable of intercepting  range missiles is under development by France and Italy.

Planned upgrades

In July 2021, it was announced that the destroyers' anti-air armament will be enhanced with the addition of a 24-cell silo for Sea Ceptor surface-to-air missiles. These were reported as likely to be in lieu of Aster 15 missiles, permitting the 48 Sylver A50 launch cells to be entirely devoted to carrying Aster 30. It was also announced that Eurosam will provide a refresh of the Aster 30 missile systems that are currently in use. All six ships are likely to be upgraded from 2026 to 2032.

In May 2022, the Ministry of Defence announced that the Royal Navy's Type 45 destroyers would be upgraded with a ballistic missile defence capability. As part of this upgrade, which is named the Sea Viper Evolution programme, the six ships will be equipped with Aster 30 Block 1 missiles and will receive upgrades to their SAMPSON radars and Sea Viper command and control systems.

Guns
 1 × BAE Systems 4.5-inch Mark 8 Mod 1 naval gun. , the Mk 8 Mod 1 is scheduled to remain in service until the 2030s, with a Mod 2 upgrade along the way to address obsolescence. 
 2 × 30 mm Small Calibre Guns on single DS-30B mounts.
 2 × Phalanx 20 mm calibre close-in weapons systems (CIWS).
 2 × 7.62 mm miniguns.
 Up to 6 × L7A2 General Purpose Machine Guns.

Aviation
The flight deck of the Type 45 is large enough to accommodate aircraft up to the size of a Boeing Chinook helicopter. It has hangar space for either one Merlin HM1 or two Westland Lynx helicopters. The Merlin HM2 has a dipping sonar, sonobuoys and radar; the Merlin can carry four anti-submarine Sting Ray torpedoes, while the smaller Lynx HMA8 can carry either two Sting Ray torpedoes or four Sea Skua anti-ship missiles. 
From 2015, the Lynx has been replaced in RN service by the AW159 Wildcat, whose weapons will include the Martlet missile from 2021 and the 'Future Air-to-Surface Guided Weapon (Heavy)' missile from 2022. The Wildcat relies on the ship's sensors in attacking submarine targets since, in RN service as of 2019, it lacks dipping sonar or sonobuoys of its own.

Anti-ship, submarine and land-attack
Four of the six Type 45 destroyers received Harpoon launchers recycled from the last four decommissioned Type 22 frigates. Duncan, Diamond and Daring have all received this upgrade. However, Harpoon SSMs are to be withdrawn from the Type 45s by 2023. As of 2022, it was reported that Harpoon SSMs were no longer deployed on the destroyer.However, HMS Duncan was reportedly fit with Harpoon as of March 2023. In November 2022, it was announced that the Royal Navy will receive the Naval Strike Missile (NSM) to replace Harpoon, which will be fitted to Type 45 destroyers.

The Type 45 has a bow-mounted medium-frequency Ultra/EDO MFS-7000 sonar but has no shipboard anti-submarine weapons. The class relies on its helicopter(s) for ASW. , there were no plans to fit anti-submarine torpedo tubes.

The 4.5-inch Mark 8 Mod 1 naval gun can be used against ships and for naval gunfire support (NGS) against land targets.

Countermeasures
 The Seagnat decoy system allows for the seduction and distraction of radar-guided weapons through active and passive means. An infrared countermeasure device is planned for future retrofits.
 Airborne Systems's Naval Decoy IDS300 floating naval decoy system (corner reflectors).
 Surface Ship Torpedo Defence System (SSTD) active torpedo decoy system.

Communications and other systems
 Fully Integrated Communications System (FICS45): a combined external and internal communications system supplied by Thales and Selex ES Ltd.
 In 2012, the UAT Mod 2.0 digital Radar Electronic Surveillance system was fitted to Daring and Diamond as part of a £40m contract with Thales UK that will see UAT Mod 2.1 fitted to the other Type 45s.
 METOC Meteorology and Oceanography: The Metoc system by BAE Systems comprises the Upper Air Sounding System using launchable radiosondes by Eurodefence Systems Ltd and Graw Radiosondes (Germany) joint venture, as well as a comprehensive weather satellite receiving system and a bathymetric system. These sensors provide each vessel with full environmental awareness for tasks such as radar propagation, ballistics, and general self-supporting meteorological and oceanographic data production.

Additional capabilities
The Type 45 has sufficient space to embark 60 Royal Marines and their equipment.

The Type 45 destroyers are designed with the ability to operate as flagships.

Ships in the class

Six ships were ordered, and transfer of custody of the first happened on 10 December 2008. The MoD's initial planning assumption was to procure twelve ships on a like-for-like replacement of a similar number of Type 42s, with the size of the second batch to be determined between 2005 and 2010. However, this was reduced to eight ships in the 2003 defence white paper entitled Delivering Security in a Changing World: Future Capabilities, following a strategic refocusing on "small to medium-scale operations" and expeditionary land operations. It was reported in December 2006 that the last two could be cut. In July 2007, Ministry of Defence officials stated that they "still planned to build eight Type 45 destroyers" and that "the extra two ships were still included in planning assumptions". This plan was officially abandoned on 19 June 2008 when the Minister for the Armed Forces, Bob Ainsworth, announced in Parliament that options for the seventh and eighth destroyers would not be taken up. The continual scaling back of the project, first from twelve to eight, and subsequently to six ships, has been criticised for leaving the Royal Navy with insufficient ships to meet its requirements.

On 9 March 2007, The Independent reported that Saudi Arabia was considering buying "two or three" Type 45s. On 7 September 2007, it was reported that Saudi Arabian officials had been invited to observe Darings sea trials.

In 2009, the House of Commons Public Accounts Committee conducted an enquiry into the procurement. Its main conclusions were that despite the destroyer being based on 80% new technology, there was a failure to take sufficient account of technical risk, over-optimism, and an inappropriate too-early fixed price project entered into before many elements had been specified. This resulted in a difficult commercial relationship until a contract renegotiation in 2007. It noted that the MoD believed six ships would still enable it to meet the operational requirement of having five ships at sea, with only a small risk of failing to meet that requirement.

In July 2016, it was reported that all six of the class were docked in Portsmouth. The Ministry of Defence said it was "unusual but not unprecedented" and that "All Type 45 destroyers are currently in port as they have either just returned from operations or are about to be deployed, are conducting training or carrying out maintenance or are home for crew to take summer leave."

Parry claimed that noise suppression in surface ships has been ignored since the end of the Cold War; the MoD responded to this claim by stating that as air defence ships, noise suppression was not a "premium requirement" for the Type 45 class.

In response to a written question in the House of Commons on 19 July 2021, Jeremy Quinn Minister of State, Ministry of Defence, detailed the status of the Type 45 destroyers as 4 undergoing refit in the UK, one being repaired abroad having been forced to detach from the CSG21 formation and one active with CSG21.

The entire class is based at HMNB Portsmouth. All ships were built by BAE Systems Surface Ships.

In December 2020, the Minister for Defence Procurement, Jeremy Quin, indicated that under current plans, the Type 45 destroyers would be decommissioned between 2035 and 2038.

See also
 
 
 
 
 
 Type 052D destroyer
 Type 83 destroyer
 Horizon-class frigate

Footnotes

References

External links

 
 

 
Ships built on the River Clyde
Destroyer classes
Ship classes of the Royal Navy
Stealth ships